The Greek Mob may refer to various ethnic Greek criminal organizations, including:
 The Greek mafia, various loosely interconnected crime groups based primarily in Greece (and sometimes including Greek-American organized crime, as listed below)
 The Philadelphia Greek Mob, a Greek American crime group based primarily in Philadelphia, Pennsylvania
 The Velentzas crime family, a Greek American crime group based primarily in New York City